Apex Tool Group is an American supplier of hand tools and power tools. It was formed as a joint venture of Cooper Industries and Danaher by the merger of Cooper Tools and Danaher's Tools and Components segment. In October 2012, Danaher and Cooper sold Apex to Bain Capital for about $1.6 billion. Apex is headquartered in Sparks, Maryland, and has over 20 factories globally including the United States, Canada, Mexico, Germany, China, and South America.

Hand tool brands 

 Allen – Hex keys
 Armstrong Tools – Industrial hand tools
 Atkins – Hacksaws
 Belzer – Mechanic's hand tools
 Campbell – Manufactures chains and clamps. Winner of the "Member's Choice" award for Best New Program at the Do It Best Fall Market in Indianapolis for its chain accessories.
 Caulkmaster – Pneumatic dispensing guns.
 Collins – Machetes, shovels, and axes
 Crescent – Produces general hand tools and tool sets. Winner of Popular Mechanics' 2006 Breakthrough Award for its Rapid-Slide variant. Acquired by Cooper in 1968.
 Delta – tool boxes
 Erem – Precision pliers.
 GearWrench – Ratcheting wrenches and hand tools
 H.K. Porter – Bolt and cable cutters.
 Iseli – Precision matched parts
 Jacob's Chuck – drill chucks
 JOBOX – truck boxes and site storage
 K-D Tools – mechanic's hand and specialty tools
 K&F – files and rasps
 Kahnetics – Dispensing systems.
 Lufkin – Manufactures measuring tools such as calipers, gauges, micrometers, and measuring tapes. Lufkin was Cooper's first hand tool acquisition in 1967.
 Mayle – Mechanic's hand tools
 Nicholson – Produces files, rasps, and saws. Acquired by Cooper in 1972.
 Plumb – Striking tools, such as hammers, axes, and chisels. Acquired by Cooper in 1980.
 SATA – Mechanic's hand tools.
 Spline Gauges – gauges
 Weller – Soldering tools. Acquired by Cooper in 1970.
 Wire-wrap – Electrical connection equipment.
 Wiss – Scissors and snips. Acquired by Cooper in 1976.
 Xcelite – Electronics tools such as general and specialized screwdrivers and pliers. Acquired by Cooper in 1973.

For Hand Tool portfolio, since 2018, Company has decided to focus 3 major brands such as Crescent, Gearwrench and SATA globally.

Power tool brands 

The Apex Tool Group Power Tool Division is headquartered in Lexington, South Carolina. It is made up of the following brands:

 APEX Assembly & Fabrication Tools – production impact sockets, bits, and universal joints
 Buckeye – material embossing
 Cleco – assembly tools
 Cooper Automation – automated fastening systems
 DGD – automated systems
 Doler – advanced drilling equipment
 Dotco – material removal tools
 Geta
 Master Power – industrial air tools
 Metronix – Servos, drivers, and speed controls
 Quackenbush – advanced drilling equipment
 Recoules – drilling tools
 Rotor – assembly equipment
 Utica – torque measurement and control tools

References

External links 

 

 
Tool manufacturing companies of the United States
Tool manufacturing companies of China
Power tool manufacturers
Automotive tool manufacturers
American companies established in 2010
Manufacturing companies established in 2010
Bain Capital companies
2012 mergers and acquisitions
Manufacturing companies based in Maryland
Companies based in Baltimore County, Maryland
2010 establishments in Maryland